Aleksandra Cotti (born 13 December 1988 in San Giovanni in Persiceto, Bologna) is an Italian water polo player. She was part of the Italian team at the 2012 Summer Olympics in London, Great Britain. The team won the silver medal at the 2016 Summer Olympics. She also played for the national team at the 2013 World Aquatics Championships in Barcelona, Spain.

See also
 List of Olympic medalists in water polo (women)

References

External links
 
 

1988 births
Living people
People from San Giovanni in Persiceto
Italian female water polo players
Water polo drivers
Water polo players at the 2012 Summer Olympics
Water polo players at the 2016 Summer Olympics
Medalists at the 2016 Summer Olympics
Olympic silver medalists for Italy in water polo
Sportspeople from the Metropolitan City of Bologna
21st-century Italian women